The 2023 Virginia's 4th congressional district special election was a special election to the U.S. House of Representatives that was held to fill  for the remainder of the 118th United States Congress. The seat became vacant after incumbent Democrat Donald McEachin died on November 28, 2022, of colorectal cancer. State Senator Jennifer McClellan was declared the victor shortly after the polls closed, winning in a landslide against her Republican opponent.

In the United States, vacancies in the House must be filled by special elections. Under Virginia law, the governor schedules the special election and political parties handle their nominating processes themselves. On December 12, 2022, Governor Glenn Youngkin announced that the special election will take place on February 21, 2023. According to the writ of election, party nominees and other prospective candidates had until December 23 to file to run in the special election.

Democratic primary 
The Fourth Congressional District Democratic Committee, responsible for choosing a nominee by December 23, organized an unassembled caucus, or "firehouse primary," on December 20 with a filing deadline of December 16. According to the Democratic Party of Virginia, the race saw the highest turnout in a "firehouse primary" in Virginia history.

The solid Democratic lean of the district meant that victory in the primary was seen as tantamount to election. Political analysts perceived the short timeline between the writ of election and the primary date as beneficial to candidates with institutional support. The major candidates in the primary were state senators Jennifer McClellan, who was considered to be the establishment favorite, and "firebrand" Joe Morrissey. Morrissey criticized the lack of polling locations in his Senate district and his campaign paid for a radio ad encouraging Republicans to vote for him.

McClellan won with 85% of the vote to Morrissey's 14%.

Candidates

Nominee 
 Jennifer McClellan, state senator from the 9th district (2017–present) and candidate for Governor of Virginia in 2021

Eliminated in primary 
 Tavorise Marks, insurance business owner and candidate for Virginia's 62nd House of Delegates district in 2019
 Joe Morrissey, state senator from the 16th district (2020–present) and candidate for Mayor of Richmond in 2016
Joseph Preston, former state delegate from the 63rd district (2015–2016)

Withdrawn 
 Lamont Bagby, state delegate from the 74th district (2015–present) and chair of the Virginia Legislative Black Caucus (endorsed McClellan)

Declined 
 Lashrecse Aird, former state delegate from the 63rd district (2016–2022)
 Colette McEachin, Richmond Commonwealth's Attorney and widow of Donald McEachin (endorsed McClellan)
 Levar Stoney, Mayor of Richmond (2017–present) and former Virginia Secretary of the Commonwealth (2014–2016) (endorsed McClellan)
 Treska Wilson-Smith, Petersburg city councilor

Endorsements

Results

Republican primary 
The Fourth Congressional District Republican Committee, responsible for choosing a nominee by December 23, held a canvass event in Colonial Heights on December 17.

Candidates

Nominee 
 Leon Benjamin, pastor, U.S. Navy veteran, and nominee for this seat in 2020 and 2022

Eliminated in primary 
 Derrick Hollie, marketing executive
 Dale Sturdifen, former chair of the Mecklenburg County Public Schools Board and candidate for Virginia's 15th Senate district in 2019

General election

Analysis 

Despite already being regarded as a safe seat, McClellan still managed to widen the margin from the previous election in the district, winning with the largest percentage of votes in any federal election in the state since 2020 and the largest of any special election since 1946. Being a special election in an off year that comes with turnout downturn, McClellan won about three quarters of the total vote, whilst Benjamin slid to just a quarter of the vote, losing for the third time in a row. McClellan swept every county in the district except for Colonial Heights City and Prince George County.

After winning the special election, McClellan was sworn in on March 7, 2023, becoming the first black congresswoman from the Commonwealth of Virginia.

Predictions

Results 

Counties that flipped from Republican to Democratic
 Dinwiddie (largest municipality: McKenney)
 Sussex (largest municipality: Jarratt)
 Southampton (largest municipality: Courtland)

See also
2023 United States House of Representatives elections
2023 Virginia elections
118th United States Congress
List of special elections to the United States House of Representatives

References

External links
Campaign websites 
Leon Benjamin (R) for Congress
Jennifer McClellan (D) for Congress

Virginia 2023 04
Virginia 2023 04
2023 04 Special
Virginia 04 Special
United States House of Representatives 04 Special
United States House of Representatives 2023 04